The 1917 Kentucky Wildcats football team represented the University of Kentucky as an independent during the 1917 college football season. Led by Stanley A. Boles in his first and only season as head coach, the Wildcats compiled a record of 3–5–1. The season ended on a high note with the 52–0 defeat of Florida.

Schedule

References

Kentucky
Kentucky Wildcats football seasons
Kentucky Wildcats football